St. Germain's railway station was located on the line between  and Watlington. It served the parish of Wiggenhall St. Germans, and closed in 1850.

History

The Bill for the Lynn and Ely Railway (L&ER) received the Royal Assent on 30 June 1845. Work started on the line in 1846.
The first section of the L&ER opened on 27 October 1846 between Lynn and Downham, and included a station at St Germain's. St Germain's station opened with the line and was situated between Watlington station and King's Lynn. It did not last long, being closed in October 1850, by which time the L&ER had amalgamated with other railways to form the East Anglian Railway.

Routes

References

Former Great Eastern Railway stations
Railway stations in Great Britain opened in 1846
Railway stations in Great Britain closed in 1850
Disused railway stations in Norfolk